Joe Steve Vásquez (born July 9, 1957) is an American prelate of the Roman Catholic Church, serving as the bishop of the Diocese of Austin in Texas since 2010. He previously served as auxiliary bishop of the Archdiocese of Galveston-Houston in Texas from 2001 to 2010.

Biography
Joe Vásquez, who is of Mexican American descent, was born on July 9, 1957, in Stamford, Texas, to Juan (b. 1933) and Elvira Vásquez (d. 2005). His father, a Korean War veteran, dropped out of school in the second grade to support his family and later made a living as a mechanic. The oldest of six children, Joe Vásquez has three brothers, Robert, Samuel, and James; and two sisters, Cynthia and Consuelo.

Vásquez attended public schools in Stamford and Abilene, Texas. From 1976 to 1980, he studied at St. Mary Seminary and the University of St. Thomas, obtaining his Bachelor of Theology degree. He then furthered his studies at the Pontifical North American College and Pontifical Gregorian University in Rome from 1980 to 1985.

Priesthood 
Vásquez was ordained to the priesthood by Bishop Joseph Fiorenza for the Diocese of San Angelo on June 30, 1984. He then served as parochial vicar at St. Joseph Parish in Odessa, Texas, until 1987, when he became pastor of St. Joseph Parish in Fort Stockton, Texas. From 1997 to 2002, Vásquez served as pastor of St. Joseph Parish in San Angelo, Texas.

Auxiliary Bishop of Galveston-Houston

On November 30, 2001, Vásquez was appointed auxiliary bishop of the Archdiocese of Galveston-Houston and titular bishop of Cova by Pope John Paul II. He received his episcopal consecration on January 23, 2002, from Archbishop Fiorenza, with Archbishop Patrick Flores and Bishop Michael Pfeifer serving as co-consecrators. Vásquez selected as his episcopal motto: "Sígueme."

Bishop of Austin
On January 26, 2010 Vásquez was appointed as bishop of the Diocese of Austin by Pope Benedict XVI, filling the vacancy left by Bishop Gregory Aymond.  Vásquez was installed by Bishop Fiorenza on March 8, 2010.

See also

 Catholic Church hierarchy
 Catholic Church in the United States
 Historical list of the Catholic bishops of the United States
 List of Catholic bishops of the United States
 Lists of patriarchs, archbishops, and bishops

References

External links 
Roman Catholic Diocese of Austin

Episcopal succession

1957 births
Living people
People from Stamford, Texas
American people of Mexican descent
University of St. Thomas (Texas) alumni
Pontifical North American College alumni
Pontifical Gregorian University alumni
Catholics from Texas
21st-century Roman Catholic bishops in the United States